Events from the year 1799 in Great Britain.

Incumbents
 Monarch – George III
 Prime Minister – William Pitt the Younger (Tory)
 Foreign Secretary – Lord Grenville
 Parliament – 18th

Events
 9 January – Prime Minister William Pitt the Younger introduces an income tax of two shillings to the pound to raise funds for Great Britain's war effort in the French Revolutionary Wars.
 20 March–21 May – British troops lend aid to the Ottoman defenders against the French Siege of Acre.
 4 May – Battle of Seringapatam: British forces defeat the Sultan of Mysore; his kingdom is divided between the Honourable East India Company and Hyderabad.
 1 July – Britain allies with Russia, Austria, Portugal, Naples, and the Ottoman Empire against France.
 12 July – Parliament passes:
 The Combination Act to outlaw trade unions.
 Unlawful Societies Act to outlaw clandestine radical societies and require a printer's imprint on all published material.
 15–19 August – A combined French and Spanish fleet stands off the south west coast of England.
 27 August – Anglo-Russian invasion of Holland: Britain and Russia send an expedition to the Batavian Republic.
 30 August – Anglo-Russian invasion of Holland: Vlieter Incident – A squadron of the Batavian Republic's navy, commanded by Rear-Admiral Samuel Story, surrenders to the British Royal Navy under Sir Ralph Abercromby and Admiral Sir Charles Mitchell near Wieringen without joining action.
 6 October – Anglo-Russian invasion of Holland: Battle of Castricum – Franco-Dutch forces defeat the Russo-British expedition force.
 16 October – Action of 16 October 1799: A Spanish treasure convoy worth more than £600,000 is captured by the Royal Navy off Vigo.
 18 October – Anglo-Russian invasion of Holland: Capitulation of Anglo-Russian expedition forces in North Holland.
 23 October – The River Severn ferry at The Tuckies, Jackfield, Shropshire capsizes and 28 workers from Coalport China Works are drowned.
 5 November – HMS Sceptre is wrecked in a storm in Table Bay, South Africa, with the loss of 349 and 41 survivors.
 The Religious Tract Society is established as an evangelical publisher in Paternoster Row, London; as The Lutterworth Press the imprint continues into the 21st century.

Ongoing
 Anglo-Spanish War, 1796–1808
 French Revolutionary Wars, War of the Second Coalition

Births
 January – James Meadows Rendel, civil engineer (died 1856)
 12 January – Priscilla Susan Bury, botanist (died 1872) 
 8 February – John Lindley, botanist (died 1865)
 16 March – Anna Atkins, botanist and photographer (died 1871)
 29 March – Edward Smith-Stanley, 14th Earl of Derby, Prime Minister (died 1869)
 17 April – Eliza Acton, cookery writer (died 1859)
 13 May – Catherine Gore, author (died  1861)
 21 May – Mary Anning, paleontologist (died 1847)
 23 May – Thomas Hood, poet (died 1845)
 18 June – William Lassell, astronomer (died 1880)
 25 June – David Douglas, Scottish botanist (died 1834 in Hawaii)
 8 September – James Bowman Lindsay, Scottish inventor (died 1862)
 21 December – Ignatius Spencer, priest (died 1864)
 James Townsend Saward, barrister and forger (date of death unknown)
 Approximate date – William Simson, Scottish-born painter (died 1847)

Deaths
 26 January – Gabriel Christie, Scottish-born general and settler in Montreal (born 1722)
 26 May – James Burnett, Lord Monboddo, Scottish judge and comparative linguist (born 1714)
 14 June – Sir Patrick Warrender, Scottish soldier and politician (born 1731)
 4 August – John Bacon, sculptor (born 1740)
 5 August – Richard Howe, 1st Earl Howe, admiral (born 1726)
 25 August – John Arnold, watchmaker (born 1736)
 3 September – William Thomas, academic and Chancellor of Llandaff Cathedral (born 1726) 
 6 October – William Withering, physician (born 1741)
4 November – Josiah Tucker, economist (born 1713)

References

 
Years in Great Britain